Worrell Goddard (21 February 1901 – 27 April 1974) was a Guyanese cricketer. He played in five first-class matches for British Guiana in 1925/26 and 1926/27.

See also
 List of Guyanese representative cricketers

References

External links
 

1901 births
1974 deaths
Guyanese cricketers
Guyana cricketers
Sportspeople from Georgetown, Guyana